Congolese people in Italy consist of migrants from Democratic Republic of the Congo and Republic of the Congo and their descendants living and working in Italy.
The presence of Congoleses in Italy dates back to the 1980s.

Numbers
In 2014 in Italy there are 7,066 regular immigrants from Democratic Republic of the Congo and Republic of the Congo. In 2018 there are estimated to be 11,000 Congolese people, mainly from the Democratic Republic of the Congo. In 2006 there were 6,167. The three cities with most number of Congoleses are: Rome, Turin and Padua.

Notable Congoleses in Italy

See also
 Congolese people in France
 Congolese people in Switzerland
 Congolese people in Germany
 Congolese people in Belgium
 Congolese people in the Netherlands
 Congolese people in Denmark
 Congolese people in Norway
 Congolese people in Sweden
 Congolese in the United Kingdom
 Congolese Americans
 Congolese Canadians
 Congolese Australians

References

African diaspora in Italy
Ethnic groups in Italy